Chrysochlora is a genus of flies in the family Stratiomyidae.

Species
Chrysochlora amethystina (Fabricius, 1805)
Chrysochlora cooksoni Lindner, 1966
Chrysochlora insularis Ricardo, 1929
Chrysochlora luteipes Ricardo, 1929

References

Stratiomyidae
Brachycera genera
Taxa named by Pierre André Latreille
Diptera of Africa
Diptera of Australasia